Swami Vevekanand Institute of Mountaineering (SVIM) is an Indian mountaineering institute located in Mount Abu, Rajasthan and operated by the Government of Gujarat. SVIM was formerly known as Gujarat State Mountaineering Institute. The establishment of this institute was by Shri Dhruv Kumar Pandya on 01/02/1965 at Dil-Pasand Banglow. In July 1969, the centre moved to Sadhana Bhawan and was renamed SVIM in 1996. 

SVIM conducts various certificate courses related to mountaineering. It also conducts various adventure camps.

A second centre affiliated with SVIM is Pandit Dindayal Upadhyay Mountaineering Centre, Junagadh, Gujarat.

References

Mountaineering in India